It's You Again may refer to:
 It's You Again (Skip Ewing song)
 It's You Again (Exile song)

See also
You Again (disambiguation)